David Masson (1822–1907) was a Scottish literary critic and historian.

David Masson may also refer to:

 David I. Masson (1917–2007), Scottish science-fiction author
 David Orme Masson (1858–1937), English and Australian chemist
 David Parkes Masson (1847–1915), British philatelist

See also
 David Mason (disambiguation)
 Masson (disambiguation)